The Emei Shan liocichla (Liocichla omeiensis) is a passerine bird in the family Leiothrichidae. The species, also known as the Omei Shan or grey-faced liocichla, is endemic to mountain ranges in Southern Sichuan, China. It is closely related to the Bugun liocichla, a species only described in 2006, and which it closely resembles.

The Emei Shan liocichla is an olive-grey coloured bird with red wing patches. The plumage on the face is grey with a slight red ring on each side of the face. The species feeds in the undergrowth of semi-tropical rainforest. It is an altitudinal migrant, spending the summer months above 1000 m and moving below 600m in the winter.

The Emei Shan liocichla is considered vulnerable by the IUCN. It is threatened by habitat loss through logging and conversion to agriculture. Some populations are protected inside reserves, such as the Emei Shan Protected Scenic Site.

References

Birdlife International Bugun Liocichla: a sensational discovery in north-east India Downloaded from https://www.webcitation.org/5QE8rvIqH?url=http://www.birdlife.org/ on 12/9/2006
BirdLife International (2006) Species factsheet: Liocichla omeiensis. Downloaded from https://www.webcitation.org/5QE8rvIqH?url=http://www.birdlife.org/ on 12/9/2006
Collar, N. J. & Robson C. 2007. Family Timaliidae (Babblers)  pp. 70 – 291 in; del Hoyo, J., Elliott, A. & Christie, D.A. eds. Handbook of the Birds of the World, Vol. 12. Picathartes to Tits and Chickadees. Lynx Edicions, Barcelona.

External links
Image at ADW

Emei Shan liocichla
Birds of Central China
Endemic birds of China
Emei Shan liocichla
Emei Shan liocichla